is a Japanese manga series written and illustrated by Ikkado Itoh. It was serialized in Shogakukan's seinen manga magazine Monthly Big Comic Spirits from July 2020 to September 2021, with its chapters collected in three tankōbon volumes.

Publication
Written and illustrated by Ikkado Itoh, I'm Not Meat was serialized in Shogakukan's seinen manga magazine Monthly Big Comic Spirits from July 27, 2020, to September 27, 2021. Shogakukan collected its chapters in three tankōbon volumes, released from December 11, 2020, to December 28, 2021.

In October 2021, Seven Seas Entertainment announced that the licensed the manga for English release in North America. It will be published under its Ghost Ship imprint starting in June 2022.

Volume list

References

External links
 

Romantic comedy anime and manga
Seinen manga
Seven Seas Entertainment titles
Sex comedy anime and manga
Shogakukan manga